Ivan Bekh (born October 9, 1940) is a professor who currently holds the position of Director of the Institute for Educational Problems. He was born in Vilchya, a village in the Polissya district of the Kiev Oblast province, and he is a respected member of the science and technology fields in Ukraine. Bekh is also a doctor of psychology (Doktor nauk) and an active member of the National Academy of Pedagogical Sciences of Ukraine.

Education 

Ivan Bekh graduated from the Faculty of Defectology, Pedagogics and Psychology at Ukraine's National Dragomanov Pedagogical University in 1964.

Career 

 1970-1993 - I. Bekh began his scientific efforts in the Psychology Research Institute at Ministry of Education of the Ukrainian SSR, where he made his way from a junior researcher to a head of the research department.
 1993-1996 - He was deputy head of the Institute of Defectology at National Academy of Pedagogical Sciences of Ukraine
 December 1996-now - He was the founder and the first Head of Institute of Problems on Education at the National Academy of Pedagogical Sciences of Ukraine

Scientific activities 

 1992 - defended a thesis for receiving a psychology doctor's degree
 1995 - was awarded a professor title
 since 1999 - an acting member of National Academy of Pedagogical Sciences of Ukraine
 2002 - was awarded an Honored Worker of Science and Technology of Ukraine

He created a unique theory of person-oriented education, an original concept of rules-driven subject-subject interaction and an act concept.

Bekh is author of more than 460 scientific papers. He has 10 individual monographs, is co-author of 9 monographs and author of 17 tracts.

References

External links 
 The Academy of Pedagogical Sciences of Ukraine
 Institute of Problems on Education (Ukrainian)
 http://www.psyh.kiev.ua (Ukrainian)
 who-is-who.ua (Ukrainian)

Ukrainian psychologists
Living people
1940 births
Recipients of the Honorary Diploma of the Cabinet of Ministers of Ukraine